The Montenegrin Embassy in Ljubljana (Montenegrin: Ambasada Crne Gore u Ljubljani) is Montenegro's diplomatic mission to the Slovenia. It is located at  Njegoševa cesta 14.

The current Ambassador of Montenegro to the Slovenia is Ranko Milović.

See also
 Montenegrin diplomatic missions
 Montenegro–Slovenia relations
 Foreign relations of Montenegro

Ljubljana
Montenegro
Montenegro–Slovenia relations